The Walter Hayes Trophy is a non-championship Formula Ford race. Sanctioned by the Historic Sports Car Club and created by James Beckett the race has grown into the most prestigious Formula Ford race worldwide. The race is held annually in November at the Silverstone Circuit.

History
Walter Hayes was a Ford Motor Company public relations executive. As a public relations executive Hayes was very much involved with racing. Hayes died on 26 December 2000, aged 76.

The first Walter Hayes Trophy was held at Silverstone between 26 and 28 August 2001. Neil Fowler won the inaugural race in a classic Lola T200 beating 48 competitors. The 2001 race was the only Trophy held in August as part of the Silverstone Historic Festival. The race was sanctioned by the BRDC. As of 2002 the race is a stand-alone event hosted by the HSCC. Gavin Wills won the race in 2002. Joey Foster is the most successful Walter Hayes Trophy racer and has won the race four times, the first three in succession in 2003, 2004 and 2005 in Reynard chassis and in 2022 with Don Hardman Racing in a Firman RFR20 chassis. Three Team USA Scholarship racers won the race, Conor Daly in 2008, Connor De Phillippi in 2009 and Tristan Nunez in 2012. Fellow Team USA Scholarship driver Oliver Askew finished second in 2016. The 2020 edition had 104 participants, three of whom were hospitalised because of a crash.

Winners

References

Formula Ford
Formula races